Decatur is an unincorporated community in eastern Byrd Township, Brown County, Ohio, United States.  It has a post office with the ZIP code 45115.  It is located along State Route 125, an east-west highway.

Decatur was originally called St. Clairsville, and under the latter name was laid out around 1802. A post office called Decatur has been in operation since 1817.

Gallery

References

Unincorporated communities in Ohio
Unincorporated communities in Brown County, Ohio
1802 establishments in the Northwest Territory

 the